St. Anne is a hill in Pińczów in western Poland. The mannierist St. Anne's Chapel is located on this hill.

References

Saint Anne
Landforms of Świętokrzyskie Voivodeship